Holzer is a German surname that could be translated to English as "Wood". Notable people include:

 Adi Holzer (born 1936), Austrian artist
 Daniel Holzer, Czech footballer
 Friedl Kjellberg ( Holzer; also Holzer-Kjellberg) (1905-1993), Austrian-born Finnish ceramist
 Hans Holzer (1920–2009), Austrian-American author and parapsychologist
 Harold Holzer (born 1949), American historian
 Jane Holzer (born 1940), American model and TV actress
 Jenny Holzer (born 1950), American artist
 Jerzy Holzer (born 1930), Polish historian
 Johann Evangelist Holzer, (1709-1740), Austrian-German painter of Augsburg Rokoko
 Josef "Sepp" Holzer (born 1942), Austrian farmer, author and agricultural consultant
 Korbinian Holzer, German ice hockey player
 Kristine Holzer (born 1974), American Olympic speed skater
 Patrick Holzer (born 1970), Italian alpine skier
 Ainhoa Holzer (born 2002), Swiss-Spanish basketball player

Toponymic surnames
German-language surnames